Ellett is the surname of the following people:

 David Ellett (born 1964), American-born Canadian professional ice hockey player
 Henry T. Ellett (1812–1887), Mississippi politician and U.S. Representative to Congress
 Neil Ellett (born 1944), Canadian soccer player
 Tazewell Ellett (1856–1914), Virginia politician and U.S. Representative to Congress
 Thomas Harlan Ellett (1880–1951), American architect
 Ron Ellett (born 1942)   American football coach.

Ellet, an alternative spelling, is the surname of the following people:
 Alfred W. Ellet (1820–1895), American Civil War general and commander of a fleet of ironclad rams
 Charles Ellet Jr. (1810–1862), American civil engineer and Civil War officer
 Charles R. Ellet (1843–1863), American Civil War officer, son of Charles Ellet Jr.
 Elizabeth F. Ellet (1818–1877), American writer, historian, and poet
 John A. Ellet (1838–1892), U.S. Navy officer in the American Civil War